Filippo Lombardi is the name of:
Filippo Lombardi (goalkeeper) (born 1990), Italian goalkeeper
Filippo Lombardi (politician) (born 1956), Swiss politician